This is a list of infectious diseases, other than the most common ones, that cause flu-like syndrome (influenza-like illness):

Bacterial
Anthrax
Brucellosis
Cat scratch fever
Legionellosis
Leptospirosis
Listeriosis
Lyme disease
Lymphogranuloma venereum
Mastitis 
Salmonellosis
Toxic Shock Syndrome
Syphilis
Tuberculosis
Scrub typhus
Rocky Mountain spotted fever

Viral
Bornholm disease (Coxsackie B virus)
Chickenpox
Cytomegalovirus
Eastern equine encephalitis virus
California encephalitis virus
Enteroviruses
Hendra virus
Hepatitis A, B, C, D, E
Herpes
HIV-1, -2
Newcastle disease
Human parainfluenza viruses
Human rhinovirus
Measles
MERS coronavirus
Human respiratory syncytial virus
Rubella
SARS coronavirus
SARS coronavirus 2
Slapped cheek syndrome
Smallpox
Togaviridae
Venezuelan equine encephalitis

Fungal
Blastomycosis
Coccidioidomycosis
Histoplasmosis
Stachybotrys chartarum

Protozoan
Babesiosis
Leishmaniasis
Malaria
Toxoplasmosis

References
WrongDiagnosis.com » Symptoms » Flu-like symptoms » Causes Retrieved on April 10, 2009

Infectious diseases